This is a list of all tornadoes that were confirmed by local offices of the National Weather Service in the United States in November and December 2011.

United States yearly total

November

November 7 event

November 8 event

November 14 event

November 15 event

November 16 event

November 21 event

December

December 20 event

December 21 event

December 22 event

Notes

References

United States,11
Tornadoes
Tornadoes
2011,11